The 2018 British Motocross Championship was the 67th British Motocross Championship season. The championship was due to start on 11 March at Lyng, but this opening event was cancelled due to bad weather. It was re-scheduled to act as the final round of the season on 14 October.

Graeme Irwin started the season as defending Champion in the MX1 class, having taken his first national title in the 2017 Championship. In the MX2 class, Ben Watson started the season as defending champion, but he did not compete in the series in 2018.

MX1

Calendar and Results
The championship was contested over 8 rounds.

Participants
List of confirmed riders.

Riders Championship
{|
|

MX2

Calendar and Results
The championship was contested over 8 rounds.

Participants
List of confirmed riders.

Riders Championship
{|
|

References 

National championships in the United Kingdom
2018 in British motorsport